"Is It Just Me?" is a song by British rock the Darkness, taken as the second single from their second studio album, One Way Ticket to Hell... And Back (2005). The single was released on 20 February 2006 and was the band's fifth consecutive top-10 hit in the United Kingdom, peaking at  8 on the UK Singles Chart. It also reached No. 36 in Ireland and No. 39 in Australia. The music video for the song features a parody of the popular Flake girl advert, which was a popular advertisement for the chocolate bar. It also features psychedelic rock star Arthur Brown as the priest, who is marrying Justin Hawkins to himself.

Track listings
 CD single
 "Is It Just Me?" – 3:05
 "Shake (Like a Lettuce Leaf)" – 3:19

 7-inch vinyl
 "Is It Just Me?" – 3:15
 "Shit Ghost" – 2:48

 Australian CD single
 "Is It Just Me?" – 3:15 
 "Shit Ghost" – 2:48
 "Shake (Like a Lettuce Leaf)" – 3:19
 "Is It Just Me?" (music video) – 3:15

 DVD single
 "Is It Just Me?" (music video) – 3:15
 "Is It Just Me?" (making of the video) – 2:00
 "Is It Just Me?" (audio) – 3:05
 "Shit Ghost" – 2:48

 Digital download
 "Is It Just Me?" – 3:05

 Digital single
 "Is It Just Me?" – 3:05
 "Shake (Like a Lettuce Leaf)" – 3:19

Charts

Release history

References

2006 singles
The Darkness (band) songs
Songs written by Justin Hawkins
Song recordings produced by Roy Thomas Baker